North Carolina elected its members August 9, 1810.

See also 
 United States House of Representatives elections, 1810 and 1811
 List of United States representatives from North Carolina

Notes 

1810
North Carolina
United States House of Representatives